Maïwenn Le Besco (born 17 April 1976), known mononymously as Maïwenn, is a French actress and filmmaker.

Early life 
Maïwenn Le Besco was born on 17 April 1976 in Les Lilas, Seine-Saint-Denis, the daughter of artist Catherine Belkhodja. She is of mixed Breton, French and Algerian descent. Her Algerian ancestry comes from her maternal grandfather. Maïwenn's stage mother pressured her to act at a young age, an experience later chronicled by Maïwenn in her one-woman shows Le Pois Chiche (The Chickpea) and I'm an Actress.

Career
Maïwenn starred in several films as a child, then teen, actress—notably as "Elle, as a child" (the child version of the lead role played by Isabelle Adjani) in the 1983 hit film L'été meurtrier (One Deadly Summer).

Following her marriage to director Luc Besson and the birth of their daughter in 1993, Maïwenn interrupted her career for several years. During this period, she only appeared in a supporting part in Besson's Léon (1994), in which she was credited as Ouin-Ouin. She also directed the film's making-of. Perhaps Maïwenn's most internationally-seen film role was her appearance as the alien Diva Plavalaguna in Besson's The Fifth Element (1997).

After she and Besson divorced, Maïwenn returned to France. She performed as a standup comedian in an autobiographical one-woman-show, and reentered the movie business after several filmmakers saw her comedy routine in Paris. She appeared in several notable movies, including the horror film Haute Tension (English title: High Tension), in which she starred opposite Cécile de France. By the time the film came out in 2003, she had decided she wanted to try directing.

In 2006, she directed her first feature film, the semi-autobiographical Pardonnez-moi. According to Maïwenn, after Besson learned she planned to use her own money to produce the film, he told her "You need to immediately stop what you're doing. You're crazy. Nobody puts their own money into a movie." After seeing the film he apologized, saying she was right on this occasion. Her second film was Le bal des actrices (2009, All About Actresses), in which she appears as herself making a documentary. She achieved international recognition when her third film, the social drama Polisse (2011), won the Jury Prize at the 2011 Cannes Film Festival. All three films feature Maïwenn with a camera, stemming from a childhood fascination and her interest in the mise en abyme, the story within a story. Her 2015 film Mon roi was selected to compete for the Palme d'Or at the 2015 Cannes Film Festival.  The release of her 2020 film, DNA, was affected by the COVID-19 pandemic. In 2022, Maïwenn is making a film, La Favorite, on the life of Louis XV starring Johnny Depp.

Personal life
Maïwenn met film director Luc Besson when she was 12 and he was 29, and they began dating when she was 15. In January 1993, at age 16, she gave birth to their daughter Shanna. On the DVD extras for the 1994 film Léon: The Professional, Maïwenn said the film is based on her relationship with Besson. She was 20 at the beginning of filming (early 1996) for The Fifth Element, during which Besson left her for the film's star, Milla Jovovich. 

In 2004, Maïwenn had a son, Diego, with Jean-Yves Le Fur, her second ex-husband who is a real estate developer.

Filmography

Actress

Director / screenwriter / producer

Theatrical writer
 2003 : ''Café de la Gare : Le pois chiche

References

External links

 

1976 births
Living people
People from Les Lilas
French film actresses
French film directors
French people of Algerian descent
French people of Vietnamese descent
20th-century French actresses
21st-century French actresses
French women film directors
French women screenwriters
French screenwriters
Best Director Lumières Award winners